Benito Lertxundi is a Basque singer-songwriter born in Orio, Gipuzkoa, Basque Country in 1942. He is an acclaimed and veteran figure in Basque music, who spearheaded with other key figures its revival in the 1960s and following years, showing a special commitment to Basque culture and matters in general.

Discography

Solo work

 Benito Lertxundi (1969)
 Ez Dok Amairu (1971)
 Oro laño mee batek... (1974)
 ..."Eta maita herria, üken dezadan plazera" (1975)
 Zuberoa / Askatasunaren semeei (1977)
 Altabizkar / Itzaltzuko bardoari (1981)
 Gaueko ele ixilen baladak (1985)
 Mauleko bidean… izatearen mugagabean (1987)
 Pazko gaierdi ondua (1989)
 Hunkidura kuttunak I (1993)
 Hunkidura kuttunak II (1993)
 Hitaz oroit (1996)
 Auhen sinfonikoa (1998)
 Nere ekialdean (2002)
 40 urtez ikasten egonak (2005)
 Itsas ulu zolia (2008)
 Oroimenaren oraina (2012)

With other artists
 Mezulari (Antonio Breschi - 1985)
 Donostia (Antonio Breschi - 1999)
 Bilbao 00:00h (Kepa Junkera - 1998)
 Lau Anaiak (2003)
 18/98+... Auzolanean (2007)

External links
Comprehensive website on Benito Lertxundi and his music

References

1942 births
Basque musicians
Spanish songwriters
Spanish male singers
People from Urola Kosta
Basque-language singers
Living people